Guillaume François (born 3 June 1990) is a Belgian professional footballer who is currently playing for Union SG in the Belgian First Division A.

References

External links

1990 births
Living people
Belgian footballers
Belgium under-21 international footballers
Belgium youth international footballers
Royal Excel Mouscron players
Beerschot A.C. players
R. Charleroi S.C. players
Belgian Pro League players
Challenger Pro League players
People from Libramont-Chevigny
Footballers from Luxembourg (Belgium)
Association football forwards
K Beerschot VA players
R.E. Virton players
Royale Union Saint-Gilloise players